The Oregon Cracker Company Building is a historic structure located in Portland, Oregon, United States. Built around 1897 as a food processing plant, and expanded in 1901, it is one of Portland's finest Romanesque Revival buildings. The building also includes early examples of structural features that were innovative for the time, but which later became common. The building was added to the National Register of Historic Places in 1979.

See also
National Register of Historic Places listings in Northwest Portland, Oregon

References

External links

1897 establishments in Oregon
Industrial buildings and structures on the National Register of Historic Places in Portland, Oregon
Industrial buildings completed in 1897
National Register of Historic Places in Portland, Oregon
Northwest Portland, Oregon
Old Town Chinatown
Portland Historic Landmarks
Romanesque Revival architecture in Oregon